Alfred Shaun Jeffares usually known as Shaun Jeffares (14 August 1906 in Cape Colony – 29 October 1997 in County Wexford, Ireland) was a South African-born Irish cricketer. A left-handed batsman and right-arm medium pace bowler, he played on first-class cricket match for Dublin University against Northamptonshire in July 1926, a match that also featured the Irish playwright Samuel Beckett. His brother Edward played cricket in India.

References

1994 deaths
Irish cricketers
Dublin University cricketers
1906 births